Elizabeth Ross Haynes (1883–1953) was an African American social worker, sociologist, and author.

Biography
Elizabeth Ross was born on July 31, 1883 in Mount Willing, Alabama to formerly enslaved parents Henry and Mary (née Carnes) Ross.
She was valedictorian of her class at the State Normal School of Montgomery. She won a scholarship to Fisk University and received her AB from there in 1903. From 1905 to 1907 she summered in Chicago, attending graduate school at the University of Chicago.
In 1908 she became the first black national secretary of the Young Women's Christian Association (YWCA).
She married sociologist George Edmund Haynes in 1910 and had a son, George Jr., in 1912. She volunteered at what would become the United States Women's Bureau and became a domestic service secretary for the United States Employment Service.
In 1919, with Elizabeth Carter and Mary Church Terrell, she petitioned the International Congress of Working Women to offer programs relevant to black women.
She wrote the 1921 book Unsung Heroes which details African-American lives and achievements.

Haynes pursued her master's degree at Columbia University where her thesis was "Two Million Negro Women at Work", a landmark study on black women and employment. She received her MA in 1923.
She was elected to the national board of the YWCA in 1924.

Ross published The Black Boy of Atlanta, her biography of R.R. Wright in 1952. Ross died in New York City on October 26, 1953.

References

External links

 

1883 births
1953 deaths
African-American social scientists
African-American women writers
American women writers
African-American writers
American sociologists
American women sociologists
American social workers
Columbia University alumni
Fisk University alumni
People from Lowndes County, Alabama
20th-century African-American people
20th-century African-American women